Shannan Marie Click (born November 17, 1983) is an American model. She has appeared in a variety of international editions of Vogue (including Vogue Italia) and the 2008, 2009, 2010 and 2011 Victoria's Secret Fashion Show.

Early life and discovery
Click was born on November 17, 1983, in San Dimas, California. She was discovered by an agent while at Huntington Beach.

Career
Click's first major modeling gig was with GUESS?. A year later, she began her international runway career, walking for designers like Miu Miu, Prada, Alexander McQueen, and Luella Bartley. She has walked in other seasons for many fashion houses, such as Yves Saint Laurent, Dior Cosmetics, Chanel, and Louis Vuitton.

Her most recent campaign work includes Pepe Jeans, Pretty by Elizabeth Arden, GAP, and Tommy Hilfiger. Other campaigns include Levi's, Emporio Armani, H&M, Dolce & Gabbana, Burberry, Dior Cosmetics, and Biotherm.

Personal life
Click began dating English actor Jack Huston in 2011. Click and Huston have one daughter, Sage Lavinia Huston, born on April 6, 2013, in New York City, and one son, Cypress Night Huston, born in January 2016.

References

External links
 
 
 
 
 
 Shannan Click at supermodels.nl

1983 births
Female models from California
Living people
People from San Dimas, California
21st-century American women